Bridelia mollis is a tree in the family Phyllanthaceae. It is native to southern Africa (Mozambique, Malawi, Zimbabwe, Zambia, Botswana, Namibia, and Limpopo).

References

mollis
Plants described in 1912
Flora of Southern Africa